Radopholus is a genus of nematodes belonging to the family Pratylenchidae.

The genus has almost cosmopolitan distribution.

Species:

Radopholus arabocoffeae 
Radopholus bridgei 
Radopholus cavenessi 
Radopholus citri 
Radopholus clarus 
Radopholus colbrani 
Radopholus crenatus 
Radopholus daklakensis 
Radopholus duriophilus 
Radopholus inaequalis 
Radopholus inanis 
Radopholus inequalis
Radopholus intermedius 
Radopholus kahikateae 
Radopholus megadorus 
Radopholus musicola 
Radopholus nativus 
Radopholus nelsonensis 
Radopholus neosimilis 
Radopholus rectus 
Radopholus rotundisemenus 
Radopholus serratus 
Radopholus similis 
Radopholus vangundyi 
Radopholus vertexplanus

References

Nematodes